The United Nations Security Council Resolution 2201 was unanimously adopted on 15 February 2015. The Security Council condemned the actions of the Houthis and demanded them to withdraw from the state institutions and release Yemeni president Abdrabbo Mansour Hadi.

See also 

 List of United Nations Security Council Resolutions 2201 to 2300
 List of United Nations Security Council resolutions concerning Yemen

References

External links 

 Resolution at undocs.org

 2201
 2201
2015 in Yemen